Femorbiona is a genus of Asian sac spiders first described by J. S. Zhang, H. Yu and S. Q. Li in 2021.  it contains only 3 species: F. brachyptera, F. phami, and F. shenzhen.

See also
 List of Clubionidae species

References

Further reading

Clubionidae genera
Spiders of Asia